Sakunosuke Koyama (19 January 1864 – 27 June 1927) was a Japanese composer and music teacher. He was the founder and president of the Japanese Music Education Federation.

Course of life 
Koyama left for Tokyo in 1880 without permission from his family and began studying English, mathematics and music at the University of Tsukiji. After obtaining his diplomas, he was appointed by the Ministry of Education as a researcher and teacher at a Music Research Center, which later changed to the Tokyo Music School. In the Ministry of Education, he was Izawa Shuji (1851–1917), the leader of the music research department, who within the so-called Dutch studies, Western natural sciences and had studied technology.

In addition to his work at this institution, he composed and published a collection of folk songs. In 1897, he was appointed professor. Although he continued to support and guide his students, he left this institution in 1903. He mainly wrote school songs, which helped him to familiarize students with European music. Some songs also made Koyama known outside of Japan, particularly in China, which had begun to incorporate European music into the education system after the defeat in the First Sino-Japanese War (1894–1895).

In 1904, he was appointed advisor and consultant to the musical instruments factory, Yamaha Corporation. During this period he strongly influenced music life, especially through the establishment of various music schools and other institutions and organizations. He was also the founder and first director of the Japanese Federation of Music Educators and first president of the Federation of Japanese Music.

Compositions

Works for concert band 
 1904: Nippon Kaigun (Japanese Navy) – text: Takeki Owada
 Lieutenant Colonel Hirose – text: Sazanami Iwaya
 Natsu wa Kinu (Summer has come)

Vocal music 
 1901: Juon shokashu ni, collection of chorals

Works for piano 
 Natsu wa Kinu (Summer has come)

References

1864 births
1927 deaths
19th-century classical composers
19th-century Japanese composers
19th-century Japanese educators
19th-century Japanese male musicians
19th-century Japanese people
20th-century classical composers
20th-century Japanese composers
20th-century Japanese educators
20th-century Japanese male musicians
20th-century Japanese people
Concert band composers
Japanese classical composers
Japanese male classical composers
Japanese music educators
Japanese Romantic composers